Captain Jack is a German Eurodance and dance-rock project formed in Darmstadt, Germany, in 1995. The project is best known for the single "Captain Jack", which reached the Top-10 in many countries in Europe.

History and career

1995: Career beginnings
The original formation consisted of Sharky Durban and Liza da Costa. They recorded the songs "Dam, Dam, Dam" and "Captain Jack". The latter is the only featured song on the band's debut album The Mission.

1995–1998: Second lineup, The Mission and Operation Dance
Sharky left the group and was replaced by Francisco Gutierrez alias Franky Gee. It was later revealed that Sharky did not provide any vocal work for the group, lip-synching to Gutierrez's vocals in the "Captain Jack" music video. After serving in the United States Army, Gutierrez had remained in Germany, where he was last stationed, and had begun a recording career under the name "Westside". While recording music under that name, he proposed the idea of a dance track based on a drill routine. That idea became the Captain Jack style. Gutierrez also introduced the Captain Jack costume, a stylized military officer's uniform based on a US Army officer's dress uniform, with a red hat based on that of the US Marines.

Gutierrez and Liza da Costa released the albums The Mission and Operation Dance and the singles "Drill Instructor" and "Holiday" before Liza da Costa left in December 1998, started a solo career and formed a jazz band called Hotel Bossa Nova in 2005.

1999–2000: Third lineup and The Captain's Revenge
Liza da Costa was replaced by the singer Maria Lucia Lozanes who went by the stage name Maloy. In this formation they released one album, called The Captain's Revenge, and the three singles: "Dream a Dream", "Get Up" with the Gipsy Kings and "Only You" before Maloy left in November 2000.

2001–2005: Fourth and fifth lineups, Franky Gee's death and Forced hiatus
Maloy was replaced by Ilka Anna Antonia Traue, alias Illi Love, who stayed until 2005. In this formation they released the five albums Top Secret, Party Warriors, Cafe Cubar, Music Instructor and their first "Greatest Hits" totaling eleven single up to the release of "Capitano", which by this point Illi Love was replaced by Sabine Repas. Soon after, Franky suffered a cerebral hemorrhage while walking with his son in Spain on October 17, 2005. Doctors predicted that the damage was fatal, and Franky Gee died at the age of 43 on Saturday October 22, 2005, after spending five days in a coma. This forced the producers to pause the project Captain Jack.

2008–2009: Reunion, new lineup, and Captain Jack is Back
The Captain Jack name was revived in summer of 2008 with Bruce Lacy and singer Jamie Lee. The new lineup's first single, "Turkish Bazar", released on 18 September 2008, was of the dance-pop and hip hop genres, dropping the original lineup's eurodance roots. It was followed by the album "Captain Jack is Back", released in 17. October 2008, and two more singles "Push It Up" and "We Will Rock You" before Captain Jack and Jamie Lee parted ways.

2010–present: Seventh lineup, Back to the Dancefloor, and Illi Love's return
In 2010 Laura Martin, participant of the fourth installment of Deutschland sucht den Superstar, the German version of Pop Idol, and the first season of The Voice of Germany, joined Bruce Lacy and replaced Jamie Lee. They released the album Back to the Dancefloor in April 2011, which featured Captain Jack classics in new DJ remixes with new songs. The album was followed by three singles "Crank It Up/Deutschland schieß ein Tor", "People Like to Party" and "How Does It Feel". In the end of 2012 Laura left the band to focus in her solo career. Michelle Stanley replaced her, and toured with Bruce Lacy until 2020, where she left the group for personal reasons.

Throughout 2020 and 2021, Bruce Lacy continued to appear as a featured artist on a number of tracks, credited as Captain Jack. In 2021, he released "Summersun", a collaboration with former Mr. President member LayZee and Illi Love, one of the vocalists from Franky Gee's era.

Musical style
Captain Jack's music was stylized as a form of military training mixed with Europop, dance-rock and dance pop music. They were musically influenced by the eurodance genre that was popular in Europe, Oceania, and South America in the 1990s. The style of eurodance was dance music with a female singer and a male rapper to follow a traditional verse-chorus structure. Captain Jack are best known for dance tracks like "Captain Jack", "Drill Instructor" or "Little Boy", although they also made slower tracks such as "Back Home", "7 Days" and "I Feel" that strayed from the europop genre. There are also some Ace of Base influenced reggae pop songs like "Soldier, Soldier" on their early albums. Captain Jack covered numerous of songs such as A-ha's "Take On Me", Queen's "Another One Bites the Dust" or Madonna's "Holiday". They also sampled classical elements like Edvard Grieg's "In the Hall of the Mountain King" in their dance song "Dream a Dream" or Johann Pachabel's "Canon in D major" in their ballad "Children". During the early 2000s Captain Jack changed their musical style from eurodance pop to summer vibe tunes, following the styles of the previous single releases "Soldier, Soldier" and "Holiday". They covered numerous well-known famous summer songs, such as Chico Buarque's "A Banda" (in their version, "Get Up"), Captain Sensible's "Say Captain, Say Wot", Huey Smith & The Clowns's "Don't You Just Know It (Don't Ha Ha)" or KC and the Sunshine Band's "Give It Up". They continued that style til the band's hiatus in 2005. In 2008 Captain Jack returned with a different new musical direction consisting of more matured dance techno sound with more R&B, Hip Hop and Oriental influences, such as "Turkish Bazar".

Other endeavours
Fans of the Konami arcade game Dance Dance Revolution know them from the numerous songs that, through the Dancemania series of albums, have been used in the game series. The group's music was also featured in other Konami music games such as beatmania and Dance Maniax.

Their songs "Children" and "Children Need a Helping Hand", collaborations with Hand in Children e.V., a supergroup charity collective, were released in 1996 and 1997.

Members

Discography

Studio albums

Singles

Video games
Captain Jack has a total of 12 songs which appear in the Dance Dance Revolution arcade series.  The band's premiere appearance was in the home release of Dance Dance Revolution 2ndMix, with three songs that were also featured in the arcade release of Dance Dance Revolution 3rdMix. This included the band's signature song, "Captain Jack", which appeared in a total of eight arcade releases.

Additionally, two Captain Jack songs are available in the StepManiaX arcade game. "Dream a Dream ~Cheeky Trax UK Remix~" is available on all versions, while "My Generation (Fat Beat Mix)" requires a free online update released on December 20, 2020.

References

External links
Official Captain Jack Website
Official YouTube Channel
Upcoming Gigs
Russian Official Website 

German musical duos
German Eurodance groups
Video game musicians
English-language singers from Germany